Frank S. Bissell was a notable wrestler and wrestling coach.

Bissell graduated from The Hill School in 1933. At Michigan, he was a National AAU Champion in 1936, and Big Ten Champion in 1937.

Bissell served as head wrestling coach at The Hill School from 1947 to 1973, where he amassed a career record of 243-66-5 and guided the wrestling team to 17 Prep National Championships.  During his tenure, 44 wrestlers claimed individual national championships. He was inducted into the National Wrestling Hall of Fame in 2012.

References

American wrestling coaches
The Hill School alumni
The Hill School faculty
University of Michigan alumni